Ewing Young "Big 'un" Freeland (January 1, 1887 – August 15, 1953) was an American football and baseball player and coach of football, basketball, and baseball. He served as the head football coach at Daniel Baker College (1912–1914), Texas Christian University (1915), Austin College (1919–1920, 1936–1938), Millsaps College (1921), Southern Methodist University (1922–1923, with Ray Morrison), and Texas Tech University (1925–1928), compiling a career college football record of 77–49–16. Freeland was also the head basketball coach at TCU for one season in 1915–16 and at Millsaps for one season, in 1921–22. In addition, he was the head baseball coach at TCU (1916), SMU (1923–1924), and Texas Tech (1926–1927), amassing a career college baseball record of 50–47–3.

Biography
Freeland was born on January 1, 1887, in Turnersville, Texas and died on August 15, 1953, in Brownwood, Texas. He played football and baseball at Vanderbilt University, from which he graduated in 1912. He weighed some 200 pounds. He was nominated though not selected for an Associated Press All-Time Southeast 1869-1919 era team. In 1915, Freeland coached football at TCU, compiling a 4–5 record. In 1922 and 1923, Freeland co-coached the SMU Mustangs football team with his former teammate at Vanderbilt, Ray Morrison. The two effectively shared the heading coaching duties, with Morrison focusing on the backfield and ends, and Freeland mentoring the linemen. In 1925, Freeland became the first coach of the Texas Tech Red Raiders football team, then known as the Matadors. He coached football at Texas Tech from 1925 to 1928, where he had a 21–10–6 record. Freeland was also the first head coach of the Texas Tech Red Raiders baseball team and Texas Tech's first athletic director. He is credited with designing Texas Tech's Double T logo and had it put on the sweaters of football players.

Head coaching record

Football

Baseball

References

External links
 

1887 births
1953 deaths
American football tackles
Baseball first basemen
Basketball coaches from Texas
Austin Kangaroos football coaches
Daniel Baker Hillbillies football coaches
Daniel Baker Hillbillies football players
Millsaps Majors football coaches
Millsaps Majors men's basketball coaches
SMU Mustangs baseball coaches
SMU Mustangs football coaches
TCU Horned Frogs baseball coaches
TCU Horned Frogs men's basketball coaches
TCU Horned Frogs football coaches
Texas Tech Red Raiders athletic directors
Texas Tech Red Raiders baseball coaches
Texas Tech Red Raiders football coaches
Vanderbilt Commodores baseball players
Vanderbilt Commodores football players
All-Southern college football players
People from Coryell County, Texas
Players of American football from Texas